Maria Christodoulou (also spelled Khristodoulou; born 28 November 1980) is a Greek former synchronized swimmer who competed in the 2004 Summer Olympics. She works at Falcon.

References

1980 births
Living people
Greek synchronized swimmers
Olympic synchronized swimmers of Greece
Synchronized swimmers at the 2004 Summer Olympics